In the United States, Red Squads were police intelligence units that specialized in infiltrating, conducting counter-measures and gathering intelligence on political and social groups during the 20th century.  Dating as far back as the Haymarket Riot in 1886, Red Squads became common in larger cities such as Chicago, New York, and Los Angeles during the First Red Scare of the 1920s. They were set up as specialized units of city police departments, as a weapon against labor unions, communists, anarchists, and other dissidents.

History 

In New York, former City Police Commissioner Patrick Murphy traced their origin there to an "Italian Squad" formed in 1904 to monitor a group of Italian immigrants under suspicion. However, it is their association with fighting communism which provides the basis for the name "Red Squad."  They became more commonplace in the 1930s, often conceived of as a countermeasure to Communist organizers who were charged with executing a policy of dual unionism—namely, building a revolutionary movement in parallel with membership in above-ground labor organizations.  Similar units were established in Canada in this period, although only the Toronto police under Chief Dennis Draper used the name.

After the civil unrest during Johnson's administration, Watergate during Nixon's administration, and the public exposure of COINTELPRO by a dissident organization in 1971, widespread criticism of the Red Squads for illegal and undemocratic tactics emerged.  In 1975, in the wake of both the Watergate scandal and the exposure of COINTELPRO, the Church Committee was formed to investigate overstepping on the part of federal law enforcement and intelligence gathering agencies.  Following the recommendations of that committee, the U.S. Congress passed Foreign Intelligence Surveillance Act (FISA) in 1978, placing limits on the power of police and Federal agencies.  This ended the official use of Red Squads.

Since 1978, the term "Red Squad" has resurfaced repeatedly to describe any action by police or Federal agencies that is deemed to be oppressive to a social or political group.

The term "Red Squad" has been used to describe New York City Police Department infiltration of liberal groups, first in preparation for the 2004 Republican National Convention and then continuing until today.

Connections to conspiracy theories 
It has been alleged by those who believe in the "Gang Stalking" conspiracies that Red Squad-style social control activity has reemerged. Individuals who believe they are being targeted claim that members of Red Squads are harassing them or organizing the harassment. Former FBI agent Ted Gunderson, who believed in a wide range of conspiracy theories, submitted an affidavit supporting the theory two months before his death at age 82.

In popular culture 
The TV series Aquarius fictionalizes activities of the Los Angeles Red Squad concerning the Black Panthers and the Manson Family in the late 1960s.

On the NBC drama series Law & Order: Special Victims Unit, during the fourteenth episode of season two, titled “Paranoia,” Det. John Munch (Richard Belzer) mentions the NYPD Red Squad during one of his conspiracy theory rants.

In Martin Cruz Smith's novel Gorky Park, NYPD Detective William Kirwell is a member of the Red Squad.

See also

References

                                Includes bibliographical references.
Encyclopedia of Chicago:  Red Squad
Red Squad. Directed by Steven Fischler, Joel Sucher, Howard Blatt and Francis Freedland. USA, 1972, b/w, 45 min.

External links
"Police Surveillance of Political Activity -- The History and Current State of the Handschu Decree, Testimony Presented To The New York Advisory Committee To The U.S. Commission On Civil Rights", Arthur N. Eisenberg, New York Civil Liberties Union (May 21, 2003)
Fighting Terror With Databases; Domestic Intelligence Plans Stir Concern, Jim McGee, The Washington Post (February 16, 2002)
"Hate Squad", Reason Magazine, Charles Paul Freund (2001)
"NYPD fights ban against spying on activists", Oliver Burkeman, The Guardian (November 30, 2002)
"Return of the Red Squad", Socialist Worker, Nicole Colson, (February 27, 2004)
"Rules Eased for Surveillance of New York Groups", Benjamim Weiser, The New York Times (February 12, 2003)
"The NYPD Wants to Watch You" , Nation's Largest Law Enforcement Agency Vies for Total Spying Power'', Chisun Lee, Village Voice, December 18–24, 2002.
 "Red Squad Returns", The Indypendent, July 4, 2003

Law enforcement in the United States
Anti-communist organizations in the United States